The queen of diamonds is a playing card in the standard 52-card deck.

Queen of Diamonds may also refer to:

Arts and entertainment
Karyssia: Queen of Diamonds, a 1987 graphic adventure game
the title character of "Marsha, Queen of Diamonds", a Batman TV series episode
Queen of Diamonds, a 1991 American independent film by Nina Menkes
"Queen of Diamonds", an episode of Laramie
"The Queen of Diamonds", a story arc in Pep Comics

People
Mabel Boll (1893–1923), American socialite nicknamed the "Queen of Diamonds" for the amount of jewelry she wore

See also

 or 

 Queen of Clubs (disambiguation)
 Queen of Hearts (disambiguation)
 Queen of Spades (disambiguation)
 Jack of Diamonds (disambiguation)
 King of Diamonds (disambiguation)
 Ace of Diamonds (disambiguation)
Muzahim Sa'b Hassan al-Tikriti, Air Defense Forces Commander of Iraq (1999-2003) under Saddam Hussein, the queen of diamonds in the US deck of most-wanted Iraqi playing cards
Diamond Queen (disambiguation)